Mark Adam Dekanich (born May 10, 1986) is a Croatian former professional ice hockey goaltender. He was selected by the Nashville Predators in the fifth round (146th overall) of the 2006 NHL Entry Draft.

Playing career
As a youth, Dekanich played in the 2000 Quebec International Pee-Wee Hockey Tournament with a minor ice hockey team from Burnaby. He later played four years of collegiate hockey at Colgate University.

During his sophomore season at Colgate, Dekanich started 36 of Colgate’s 39 games where he set a then-school-record of 988 saves. He ranked first in the ECACHL conference for the 2005–06 season with a .924 save percentage and was subsequently named to the all-ECAC first team and won the Ken Dryden Award as the ECAC Goaltender of the Year.

In his junior season, Dekanich started 36 of Colgate’s 40 games where he broke his single-season saves record with .993.  Although his postseason ended early due to injury, he was selected to the all-ECAC second team and ECAC all-academic team.

As a senior during the 2007–08 season, he was named to the Lowe's Senior CLASS All-Senior All-America first team and Selected to the all-ECAC Hockey third team.  At the conclusion of the season he signed an entry level contract with the Nashville Predators.

On December 3, 2010, the Nashville Predators called Dekanich up from the Milwaukee Admirals, however he did not make his NHL debut until December 18, 2010 when he played 50 minutes against the Los Angeles Kings in relief of the Predators' starter Anders Lindbäck.

On July 3, 2011, Dekanich was signed as a free agent by the Columbus Blue Jackets. However, he missed the majority of the 2011–12 season recovering from reconstructive ankle surgery. On July 6, 2012, Dekanich left the Blue Jackets organization and signed as a free agent to a one-year, contract with the Winnipeg Jets.

On May 20, 2013, Dekanich signed his first European contract with Croatian team KHL Medveščak, which competed in the KHL for the 2013–14 season.

After two seasons in Zagreb, Dekanich returned to North America, signing a one-year ECHL contract with the South Carolina Stingrays on September 10, 2015. He was invited to AHL affiliate, the Hershey Bears, training camp prior to the 2015–16 season, and was signed to an AHL contract with the club before he was returned to the Stingrays on October 15, 2015.

On August 18, 2016, Dekanich signed an AHL contract with the Lehigh Valley Phantoms. He most recently played for the Reading Royals of the ECHL. In November 2018, Dekanich announced his retirement on Twitter.

He currently runs his own strength and conditioning business by the name of Dexshow High Performance.

Records
Dekanich currently holds the Milwaukee Admirals single season records in both save percentage (0.931) and goals against average (2.02).

Career statistics

Regular season and playoffs

Awards and honours

References

External links

Twitter.com: Mark Dekanich Twitter Page

1986 births
Canadian expatriate ice hockey players in Croatia
Canadian ice hockey goaltenders
Canadian people of Croatian descent
Cincinnati Cyclones (ECHL) players
Colgate Raiders men's ice hockey players
Croatian ice hockey goaltenders
Hershey Bears players
Ice hockey people from British Columbia
KHL Medveščak Zagreb players
Lehigh Valley Phantoms players
Living people
Milwaukee Admirals players
Nashville Predators draft picks
Nashville Predators players
Reading Royals players
South Carolina Stingrays players
Sportspeople from North Vancouver
Springfield Falcons players
St. John's IceCaps players